Protein Jumonji is a protein that in humans is encoded by the JARID2 gene. JARID2 is a member of the alpha-ketoglutarate-dependent hydroxylase superfamily.

Jarid2 (jumonji, AT rich interactive domain 2) is a protein coding gene that functions as a putative transcription factor. Distinguished as a nuclear protein necessary for mouse embryogenesis, Jarid2 is a member of the jumonji family that contains a DNA binding domain known as the AT-rich interaction domain (ARID). In vitro studies of Jarid2 reveal that ARID along with other functional domains are involved in DNA binding, nuclear localization, transcriptional repression, and recruitment of Polycomb-repressive complex 2 (PRC2). Intracellular mechanisms underlying these interactions remain largely unknown.

In search of developmentally important genes, Jarid2 has previously been identified by gene trap technology as an important factor necessary for organ development. During mouse organogenesis, Jarid2 is involved in the formation of the neural tube and development of the liver, spleen, thymus and cardiovascular system. Continuous Jarid2 expression in the tissues of the heart, highlight its presiding role in the development of both the embryonic and the adult heart. Mutant models of Jarid2 embryos show severe heart malformations, ventricular septal defects, noncompaction of the ventricular wall, and atrial enlargement. Homozygous mutants of Jarid2 are found to die soon after birth. Overexpression of the mouse Jarid2 gene has been reported to repress cardiomyocyte proliferation through it close interaction with retinoblastoma protein (Rb), a master cell cycle regulator. Retinoblastoma-binding protein-2 and the human SMCX protein share regions of homology between mice and humans.

Model organisms

Model organisms have been used in the study of JARID2 function. A conditional knockout mouse line, called Jarid2tm1a(KOMP)Wtsi was generated as part of the International Knockout Mouse Consortium program — a high-throughput mutagenesis project to generate and distribute animal models of disease to interested scientists — at the Wellcome Trust Sanger Institute.

Male and female animals underwent a standardized phenotypic screen to determine the effects of deletion. Twenty six tests were carried out and two phenotypes were reported. Homozygous mutant embryos were identified during gestation but almost half showed signs of oedema, and in a separate study, only 1% survived until weaning (significantly less than the Mendelian ratio). The remaining tests were carried out on heterozygous mutant adult mice; no significant abnormalities were observed in these animals.

References

Further reading

External links 
 

Human 2OG oxygenases
EC 1.14.11
Transcription factors
Genes mutated in mice